The prime minister of Italy is the head of the Council of Ministers, which holds effective executive power in the Italian government. The first officeholder was Camillo Benso, Count of Cavour, who was sworn in on 23 March 1861 after the unification of Italy. Cavour previously served as Prime Minister of the Kingdom of Sardinia, an office from which the Italian prime minister took most of its powers and duties. During the monarchy period, prime ministers were appointed by the king of Italy, as laid down in the Albertine Statute. From 1925 until the fall of his regime in 1943, fascist dictator Benito Mussolini formally modified the office title to "Head of Government, Prime Minister and Secretary of State". From 1861 to 1946, 30 men served as prime ministers, leading 67 governments in total.

After the abolition of the Kingdom of Italy in 1946 and the proclamation of the Italian Republic, the office was established by Articles 92 through 96 of the Constitution of Italy. Alcide De Gasperi is the only prime minister who has held this position both in the Kingdom of Italy and in the Republic of Italy. 

The prime minister is appointed by the President of the Republic and must receive a confidence vote by both houses of Parliament: the Chamber of Deputies and the Senate. From 1946 to 2022, in the first 76 years after the creation of the Republic, 30 men served as prime ministers. 
The current officeholder is Giorgia Meloni, who was appointed on 22 October 2022, becoming the first woman to hold this office.

The longest-serving prime minister in the history of Italy was Benito Mussolini, who ruled the country from 1922 until 1943; the longest-serving prime minister of the Italian Republic is Silvio Berlusconi, who held the position for more than nine years between 1994 and 2011. The shortest-serving officeholder was Tommaso Tittoni, who served as prime minister for only 16 days in 1905, while the shortest-serving prime minister of the Italian Republic was Fernando Tambroni, who governed for 123 days in 1960.

Prime ministers of Italy

Prime ministers of the Kingdom of Italy (1861–1946) 

Parties:

CoalitionsAcronyms and abbreviations:Symbols: Died in office

 Prime ministers of the Italian Republic (1946–present) Parties:Coalitions:Acronyms and abbreviations:'''

Timeline

Kingdom of Italy (1861–1946)

Italian Republic (1946–present)

See also 
 Deputy Prime Minister of Italy
 Lists of office-holders
 List of prime ministers of Italy by time in office
 Politics of Italy
 Prime Minister of Italy

References

Bibliography
 
 
 
 

Italy
Prime Ministers